The call letters WHDH may represent:

 WHDH (TV) (digital channel 35, virtual channel 7): an independent television station in Boston, Massachusetts that was formerly affiliated with CBS and NBC
 WHDH-TV (defunct) channel 5: a television station in Boston that existed from 1957 to 1972; replaced by WCVB-TV
 WEEI (AM) AM 850, a radio station in Boston that previously used the WHDH callsign